TVN may refer to:

 TVN (Australian TV channel), a former horse racing channel
 Televisión Nacional de Chile, a public broadcaster
 TVN (Indonesia), a former television station; predecessor of Rajawali Televisi
 TVN (Norway), or TVNorge, a commercial television channel
 TVN (Panamanian TV network), a television network
 TVN (Polish TV channel), a commercial broadcaster
 tvN, a South Korean commercial general entertainment channel
 tvN Asia, a Korean entertainment channel
 TVN Entertainment Corporation, a former US satellite television company
 Television News Inc., an American news service of the 1970s
 Nara Television, a Japanese commercial broadcaster